York Township is one of thirteen townships in Noble County, Indiana. As of the 2010 census, its population was 1,605 and it contained 642 housing units.

Geography

Unincorporated towns
 Port Mitchell at 
(This list is based on USGS data and may include former settlements.)

References

External links
 Indiana Township Association
 United Township Association of Indiana

Townships in Noble County, Indiana
Townships in Indiana